Barlow is an English surname.

Origins and variants 
One theory suggests that the surname is related to the place of the same name in Derbyshire and mean "[lives on] the bare hill". At the time of the British census of 1881, the frequency of the surname Barlow was highest in Cheshire (4.4 times the British average), followed by Lancashire, Nottinghamshire, Staffordshire, Buckinghamshire, Derbyshire, Berkshire, Rutland and Warwickshire.

People with the surname
Ambrose Barlow (1585–1641), English Roman Catholic martyr
André Barlow (born 1953), South African minister from the Dutch Reformed Church
Andrew Barlow (1899–1961), Australian cricket umpire
Andrew Henry Barlow (1837–1915), politician in Queensland, Australia
Andy Barlow (footballer) (born 1965), English football player
Andy Barlow (producer), English musical producer, member of band Lamb
Barriemore Barlow (born 1949), English drummer, former member of Jethro Tull
Ben Barlow (born 1994), Welsh vocalist with pop punk band Neck Deep
Bill Barlow (1931–2020), Canadian politician
Billy Barlow (1871–1963), Canadian ice hockey player
Bryan Alwyn Barlow (born 1933), Australian botanist, former director of the Australian National
Calvin S. Barlow (1856–1920), Washington state pioneer, businessman, and politician
Celia Barlow (born 1955), British Labour Party politician
Charles Sydney Barlow (1905–1979), South African conservationist, for whom Barlow's lark is named
Clarence Barlow (born 1945), composer of classical and electroacoustic works
Colin Barlow (1935–2018), English football player
David Barlow (basketball) (born 1983), Australian professional basketball player
Denise P. Barlow (1950–2017), British geneticist
Dick Barlow (1851–1919), Lancashire and England cricketer
Eeben Barlow, founder of Executive Outcomes
Elmer E. Barlow (1887–1948), American jurist
Emilie-Claire Barlow (born 1976), Canadian jazz singer, voice actress
Erasmus Darwin Barlow (1915–2005), British psychiatrist
Francis Barlow (artist) (est. 1626–1704), British painter, etcher, and illustrator
Francis C. Barlow (1834–1896), US lawyer, politician, and general
Frank Barlow (disambiguation), several people
Ferdinand Barlow (1881–1951), French classical composer
Gary Barlow (born 1971), English singer-songwriter, best known for being a member of the boy band Take That
George Barlow (disambiguation), several people
Sir George Barlow, 1st Baronet (1763–1846), Acting Governor-General of India from 1805 to 1807
George Hilaro Barlow (physician) (1806–1866), Royal College of Physicians, first editor of Guy's Hospital Reports
Graham Barlow (born 1950), English Test and county cricketer (Middlesex CCC)
Haven J. Barlow (1922–2022), American politician
Henry Clark Barlow (1806–1876), English writer on Dante
Horace Barlow (1921–2020), Cambridge physiologist, neuroscientist, vision scientist
Iman Barlow
Jack Barlow (1924–2011), American country music singer-songwriter
James A. Barlow (1923–2015), American geologist and politician
James Barlow Hoy (1794–1843), Irish-born politician
Joe Barlow (born 1995), American baseball player
Joel Barlow (1754–1812), American poet and diplomat
John Barlow (disambiguation), several people
John Barlow (1815–1856), veterinary scientist at the University of Edinburgh 
John Henry Barlow (1855–1924), Quaker statesman, pacifist and co-founder of the Friends Ambulance Unit
Ken Barlow (basketball) (born 1964), American former professional basketball player 
Kevan Barlow (born 1979), NFL running back
Kim Barlow, musician
Leonard Monteagle Barlow (1898–1918), British World War I flying ace
Lou Barlow (born 1966), musician, member of the bands Dinosaur Jr and Sebadoh
Marcus Barlow (1890–1955), Australian architect 
Martin T. Barlow (born 1953), British mathematician
Matt Barlow (born 1970), vocalist of the heavy metal band Iced Earth
Maude Barlow (born 1947), Canadian author and activist
Michael Barlow (born 1987), Australian rules footballer
Micah Barlow (1873–1936), English cricketer
Mike Barlow (born 1948), American Major League Baseball player
Milt G. Barlow (1843–1904), American vaudeville and minstrel player
Patrick Barlow (born 1947), British actor and dramatist
Peter Barlow (disambiguation), several people
Phyllida Barlow (born 1944), British sculptor and art academic
Randy Barlow (1943–2020), American country music singer
Reginald Barlow (1866–1943) American soldier and stage and screen actor
Richard Barlow (Intelligence analyst), CIA whistleblower
Robert Barlow (disambiguation), several people
Sam Barlow (disambiguation), several people
Scott Barlow, (born 1976) American professional baseball player
Scott Barlow (baseball) (born 1992), American baseball player
Stephen Barlow (disambiguation), several people
Thomas Barlow (disambiguation), several people
Tim Barlow (1936-2023), English actor
Walter Jarvis Barlow (1868–1937), founded Barlow Sanatorium in 1902, now Barlow Respiratory Hospital, in Los Angeles 
William Barlow (disambiguation), several people

Fictional characters
Charles Barlow, a police inspector in the British crime dramas Z-Cars, Softly, Softly, Barlow at Large and Second Verdict
Kurt Barlow, character in Stephen King's novel Salem's Lot
Nora Barlow, a character in the book series Leviathan
Kate Barlow, a character in the movie Holes
Elder Joseph Barlow, a character in August Wilson's play Radio Golf
Barlow (no first name), Sherlock Holmes's dentist in How Watson Learned the Trick, by Arthur Conan Doyle

Coronation Street
The British soap opera Coronation Street has featured the Barlow family since its inception in 1960, and had therefore featured multiple characters with the surname, who are listed alphabetically below.
Adam Barlow
Amy Barlow
Carla Barlow
David Barlow (Coronation Street)
Deirdre Barlow
Frank Barlow (Coronation Street)
Ida Barlow
Irma Barlow
Janet Barlow (Coronation Street)
Jessica Barlow
Ken Barlow
Leanne Barlow
Lucy Barlow
Peter Barlow (Coronation Street)
Sarah Barlow
Shelley Barlow
Simon Barlow
Susan Barlow
Tracy Barlow
Valerie Barlow

See also
Barlowe
Bartow (name)

References 

English-language surnames
English toponymic surnames